Belgaum, officially Belagavi, Lok Sabha seat, is one of the 28 Lok Sabha constituencies in the Indian state of Karnataka.

Vidhana Sabha segments
The composition of Belgaum Lok Sabha seat has undergone several changes. In 1962, there were three assembly seats in the constituency from Belgaum, named Belgaum City, Belgaum I and Belgaum II. Then the map was redrawn and some seats like Khanapur, Uchagaon and Bagewadi were added to Belgaum seat as part of renaming. In 2008, it was back to three seats named after the city of Belgaum : North, South, and Rural. Since 2008, this seat comprises the following eight assembly segments in Karnataka Vidhan Sabha:

Members of Parliament

^ by-poll

Election results

2021 Bypoll 

Source:

2019 Lok Sabha

2014 Lok Sabha

2009 Lok Sabha

1984 Lok Sabha
 Shanmukhappa Basappa Sidnal (INC) : 202,506
 Appayyagouda Basagouda Patil (JNP) : 166,966
 Prabhakar Pawashe (Maharashytra Ekikaran Samiti) : finished third.

See also
 Belgaum North Lok Sabha constituency
 Belgaum South Lok Sabha constituency
 Belagavi district
 List of Constituencies of the Lok Sabha

References

Lok Sabha constituencies in Karnataka
Belagavi district